Samuel Perry (1877–1954) was a Labour Co-operative politician in the United Kingdom.

Samuel or Sam Perry may also refer to:

Samuel Augustus Perry (1787–1854), English-born soldier and surveyor
Samuel Marshall Perry (1836–1898), early Los Angeles councilman
Samuel Perry (ironmaster) (1864–1930), founder of Perry Engineering of South Australia
Sam Perry (composer) (1884–1936), musician and composer of scores of films such as The Last Performance, The Jade Box and The Spell of the Circus
Sam Perry (swimmer) (born 1995), New Zealand swimmer
Sam Perry (looping artist) (born 1989), won the seventh series of The Voice Australia
Sam Perry (footballer) (born 2001 or 2002), English footballer
Samuel Victor Perry (1918–2009), English biochemist
Samuel E. Perry (born 1969), professor of East Asian Studies at Brown University

See also